David Clarkson may refer to:
 David Clarkson (Scottish footballer)
 David Clarkson (minister) (1622–1686), English Puritan
 David Clarkson (ice hockey) (born 1984), Canadian hockey forward
 David Augustus Clarkson (1793–1850), Hudson River valley landowner
 David Clarkson (NYSE) (1795–1867), president of the New York Stock Exchange
 David Clarkson (Australian soccer) (born 1968), soccer player

See also
 Clarkson (disambiguation)
 Clarkson (surname)